Lally Cadeau (born Alice Mary Cadeau, 10 January 1948) is a Canadian stage, television, film, and radio actress.

Life and career
Alice Mary Cadeau was born in Burlington, Ontario, the youngest child and only daughter of a once-aspiring actress from Hamilton and a French-Canadian from Penetanguishene. Her father died when she was 6 years old. She attended Stoneleigh-Prospect Hill School for girls in Greenfield, Massachusetts; Edenhall Convent of the Sacred Heart in Philadelphia; and Havergal College in Toronto. Cadeau appeared as Elizabeth Rex at age 10 with the Hamilton Players Guild, and when 13 in Terrence Rattigan's Five Finger Exercise. She studied under Dora Mavor Moore.

A perennial stage, television, film and radio actress, she has been a mainstay with the Stratford Festival since 1997. She was in two television series, the CBC's Hangin' In and Sullivan Entertainment's Road to Avonlea. Since 1980, she has been the recipient of many nominations and awards, including a Bijou, a Genie, two Geminis, and two Dora Mavor Moore awards. These were for her work in Harvest, You've Come a Long Way, Katie, Road to Avonlea, and the stage plays Saturday, Sunday, Monday and Rose. Her work for the Stratford Festival has included the roles of Filumena, Juno Boyle, Jean Brodie, Mrs. van Damm, The Duchess of York, The Nurse and Lottie Childs.

Personal life
Cadeau was married to the Robin Weatherstone (d. 2018), with whom she had two sons, Christopher, and Bennet. She also had a daughter, Sara Brooke, from a previous relationship.

Filmography

Film

Television

References

External links 
 

1948 births
Living people
Canadian child actresses
Canadian film actresses
Canadian television actresses
Canadian stage actresses
Canadian voice actresses
Franco-Ontarian people
People from Burlington, Ontario
Dora Mavor Moore Award winners
20th-century Canadian actresses
21st-century Canadian actresses
Best Actress in a Drama Series Canadian Screen Award winners